The Camp Speicher massacre occurred on 12 June 2014, when the Islamic State killed between 1,095 to 1,700 Iraqi cadets in an attack on Camp Speicher in Tikrit, Iraq. At the time of the massacre, there were between 5,000 and 100,000 unarmed cadets in the camp, and ISIL fighters selected the Shias and non-Muslims for execution. It is the second deadliest act of terrorism in history, only surpassed by the September 11 attacks.

The Iraqi government blamed the massacre on the Islamic State.

Attack
Several survivors later testified that their senior officers in the camp had forced them to leave the camp. Hassan Khalil, one survivor, who managed to escape by pretending to be dead under another corpse and fleeing at night, said: "Our chief officers are the reason behind the killings. They forced us to leave Speicher. They assured us there was a safe passage, that it was guarded by the tribes, and told us not to wear uniforms." "They sold us to ISIS" he added. The Iraqi government and national television denied that story. They said the cadets forced their way out of the camps after the military had already dispatched special forces to the dangerous camps' area to secure them, and that they'd been warned against leaving.

400 cadets ordered to leave Camp Speicher before the attack were arrested by government forces and are missing.   

Peter Bouckaert, the emergencies director for Human Rights Watch (HRW), stated: "The photos and satellite images from Tikrit provide strong evidence of a horrible war crime that needs further investigation. [ISIS] and other abusive forces should know that the eyes of Iraqis and the world are watching".

The photos show masked ISIL fighters tying up the cadets and loading them up on trucks, with other photographs showing ISIL fighters killing dozens of the cadets with assault rifles while they are lying down. ISIL propaganda videos show them shooting at hundreds of men lined up in mass graves in the desert. Some cadets faked their death, covering themselves with blood and escaping at night. Survivor Ali Hussein Kadhim told his story to The New York Times following his escape from the massacre.

ISIL released footage of the massacre as part of their propaganda video Upon the Prophetic Methodology. The cadets are seen being crammed into trucks, some of them wearing civilian clothes to hide their military uniforms. Most of them are lying on the ground, with their jeans stripped to reveal camouflage uniforms underneath. Some of the prisoners were forced to defame Iraq's prime minister, Nouri al-Maliki, while others were forced to shout "long live the Islamic State". Some of them were beaten to death with a rifle. The killing methods varied, from shooting the cadets one by one to shooting them while lying down many times to ensure death. Some cadets were shot and dumped into the Tigris river.

Aftermath

The Iraqi government said that 57 members of the Arab Socialist Ba'ath Party had taken part in the massacre. Although pictures showed that every armed man was from ISIS, the government stated "Without any doubts and suspicion, all of these criminals are from the banned Ba'ath Party." The Minister of Defense, Sa'dun al-Dulaimi, stated that the massacre was not sectarian in nature. Although the spokesman of the Iraqi Armed Forces, Qasim Atta, stated that there were almost 11,000 cadets and soldiers missing from Camp Speicher; he also stated that thousands were executed in or near the presidential palaces, the al-Bu Agail region, and the Badoush prison by sectarian violence.

On 2 September, more than 100 members of the families of the killed and missing cadets and soldiers broke into the Iraqi Parliament and hit three of the security guards. After a day, a session started in the parliament with the attendance of representatives of the families and Sa'dun al-Dulaimi, along with other military officials to discuss the massacre.

On 16 September, the Kurdish Asayish arrested four people suspected to be involved in the massacre in southern Kirkuk. An unnamed security source stated, "The operation was executed by relying on intelligence information to arrest them."

On 18 September, the Iraqi Human Rights ministry stated that as of 17 September, the total number of missing soldiers and cadets was 1,095, denying the most popular figure of 1,700 soldiers having been killed. The ministry added, "The ministry relied in its statistics on spreading forms on the families of the missing people in Baghdad and the other governorate within its quest to document the crimes and violations that the terrorist group of the Islamic State is committing towards our people." The Iraqi government ordered them to pay 10 million Iraqi dinar (equivalent to US$8,600) to the families of the missing cadets.

Fall of ISIS 
Following the Iraqi forces' victory over ISIL in Tikrit in early April 2015, mass graves containing some of the murdered cadets were located and the decomposed corpses began to be exhumed. Two of the alleged perpetrators of the massacre were arrested in Forssa, Finland, in December 2015. The suspects were identified from ISIL propaganda videos in which the executions of 11 men took place. Police did not disclose whether the men had made applications for asylum in Finland. On 13 December 2016, the 24-year-old twins were charged with murder and committing a war crime for allegedly killing unarmed cadets, as well as "aggravated assault with terrorist aims". They were acquitted by the Pirkanmaa District Court in May 2017. After the prosecution appealed the ruling they were again acquitted by the Turku Court of Appeal in February 2020 due to lack of evidence for the involvement of the brothers in the massacre.

In August 2016, 36 men were executed by hanging for their part in the massacre. On 6 September 2016, three mass graves were found by the Kata’ib al-Imam Ali brigade containing the remains of over 30 people killed in the massacre. In August 2017, 27 people were sentenced to death for their involvement in the massacre, and another 25 men were released due to lack of evidence.

Gallery

See also 

 Persecution of Shias by the Islamic State

References

2014 murders in Iraq
Iraqi Air Force
Islamic terrorist incidents in 2014
June 2014 crimes in Asia
June 2014 events in Iraq
Kidnapping in the 2010s
Kidnappings in Iraq
Massacres in 2014
Massacres of the War in Iraq (2013–2017) perpetrated by ISIL
Religiously motivated violence in Iraq
Saladin Governorate
Terrorist incidents in Iraq in 2014
Violence against Shia Muslims in Iraq
Shia–Sunni sectarian violence